Bobby Darin Sings Ray Charles is an album by American singer Bobby Darin, released in 1962. It reached number 96 on the Billboard 200 and remained there for 11 weeks.

Background
Darin recorded the album as a tribute to Ray Charles. His version of "What'd I Say" was a Grammy nomination for Best Rhythm and Blues Recording. Guest soloists included Nino Tempo, Plas Johnson and Darlene Love. Darin once said, "I'm proud to say that I was on the Ray Charles bandwagon when it was just a baby carriage. In fact, two singers—Fats Domino and Ray Charles—opened up my ears to a whole new world, different from anything I'd heard until then. They both became major influences when I realized these are the roots."

The album was reissued on CD in 2004.

Reception

In his Allmusic review, critic JT Griffith wrote "In addition to the rocking "What'd I Say," standouts include the swinging testament to love, "I Got a Woman," "Ain't That Love," and "Hallelujah I Love Her So."... A listener can debate if these covers are as good as the originals (could they be?) but not the authenticity that jumps off the turntable."

Track listing
All songs by Ray Charles unless otherwise noted.	
"What'd I Say" – 4:08	
"I Got a Woman" (Charles, Renald Richard) – 6:34
"Tell All the World About You" (Charles, Percy Mayfield) – 1:54
"Tell Me How Do You Feel" – 2:50
"My Bonnie" – 2:33
"The Right Time" (Lew Herman) – 3:28
"Hallelujah I Love Her So" – 2:51
"Leave My Woman Alone" – 3:16
"Ain't That Love" – 2:57
"Drown in My Own Tears" (Henry Glover) – 3:23
"That's Enough" – 2:23

Personnel
Bobby Darin – vocals
Nino Tempo, Plas Johnson – saxophone
Darlene Love – vocals (on "The Right Time")
The Blossoms – backing vocals
Jimmie Haskell – arrangements

References

1962 albums
Bobby Darin albums
Atco Records albums
Albums arranged by Jimmie Haskell
Albums produced by Ahmet Ertegun